Carlos Gregorio Dávila Espinoza (September 15, 1887 – October 19, 1955), was a Chilean political figure, journalist, chairman of the Government Junta of Chile in 1932, and secretary general of the Organization of American States (OAS) from 1954 until his death in 1955.

Early life
Dávila was born in Los Ángeles, Chile, to Luis Dávila and Emilia Espinoza. He graduated from the University of Santiago, Chile, (then called School of Arts and Crafts) in 1907. In 1911, he entered law school at the University of Chile, but dropped out three years later to work for newspaper El Mercurio, of Santiago. He left that paper in 1917 to establish La Nación of the same city, which he directed until 1927. In 1932, he founded the Chilean magazine Hoy.

Political career
From 1927 to 1931, Dávila served as Chilean ambassador to the United States. In 1929, he received an honorary LL.D. from Columbia University, and another the same year from the University of Southern California, in Los Angeles, California.

Socialist Republic of Chile

Dávila was a member of the Government Junta of Chile that controlled Chile from June 4 to July 8, 1932, serving as president of the Government Junta from June 16. On July 8, Dávila dissolved the Government Junta and assumed power as "Provisional President of Chile", calling new congressional elections. He served as provisional President of Chile until September 13, one of six people during that year to lead the country as President of Chile and/or President of the Government Junta.

Professor, journalist and international public service
In 1933, Dávila was visiting professor of international law at the University of North Carolina at Chapel Hill, under the auspices of the Carnegie Endowment for International Peace. Later he came to the United States and was associated for many years with the Editors Press Service, and acted as correspondent for numerous important South American newspapers. In 1941 he received the Maria Moors Cabot Award from Columbia University for his distinguished journalistic contribution in the service of the Americas. A prolific writer, Dávila is the author of "We of the Americas", published in 1949 and has contributed many analytical studies on politics and economics to leading American publications.

Dávila served on the Council of United Nations Relief and Rehabilitation Administration from 1943 to 1946, and was Chilean representative to the Inter-American Financial and Economic Advisory Committee in 1940. In the same year, he became the author of the "Dávila plan", which created the Inter-American Development Commission, which became the Inter-American Council for Integral Development within the Organization of American States, when that body was created in 1948. In 1946, he served as a member of the United Nations Economic and Social Council.

Having contributed to the founding of the OAS, Dávila was chosen, in August 1954, as its secretary general.

Personal life 
Dávila's first wife, Herminia Arrate de Dávila, died in Chile in 1941, and Dávila returned to the United States with their two daughters, Luz and Paz. In 1950, he remarried, this time to Frances Adams Moore of Massachusetts, a widow with a daughter, Dolly, by her first husband.

Dávila died on 19 October 1955, 14 months into his service as secretary general of the Organization of American States.

References
OAS children's site
"Carlos Dávila Espinoza: 1887-1944". Enciclopedia Escolar Icarito. 
"'Progressive Socialism'". Time. 20 June 1932.

1887 births
1955 deaths
People from Los Ángeles, Chile
Socialist Party of Chile politicians
Chilean people of Spanish descent
Presidents of Chile
Heads of state of Chile
Ambassadors of Chile to the United States
Secretaries General of the Organization of American States
Chilean diplomats
Chilean journalists
Male journalists
Leaders who took power by coup
20th-century journalists
University of Chile alumni
University of Santiago, Chile alumni
Maria Moors Cabot Prize winners